Cagny is a commune in the Somme department in Hauts-de-France in northern France.

History
The town was occupied by Germany during World War II, and saw fighting during July 1944.  The British attacked on the 18th, but defense from a nearby Flak battery held off the attack, destroying numerous British tanks.  Eventually, the British did succeed in liberating the town.

Geography

Population

Places of interest
The site of Cagny-La-Garenne 2 has evidence of humans Homo heidelbergensis from an inter-Ice-age environment (about 300,000 years ago).

See also
Communes of the Somme department

References

External links

(All French language)
Official website

Communes of Somme (department)